Dinesh Medh (1928 – 27 January 2014) was an Indian cricketer. He played first-class cricket for Gujarat and Mysore between 1946 and 1963.

References

External links
 

1928 births
2014 deaths
Indian cricketers
Gujarat cricketers
Karnataka cricketers
Place of birth missing